Acta Geologica Polonica is a peer-reviewed open access scholarly journal publishing original papers on all aspects of geology. It is published by the Institute of Geology, University of Warsaw. The current editor-in-chief is Piotr Łuczyński.

Abstracting and indexing 
According to the Journal Citation Reports, the journal had a 2020 impact factor of 0.983. The journal is abstracted and indexed in:

References

External links 
 

Open access journals
Publications established in 1950
English-language journals
Geology journals